Draugiem (For Friends) is a social networking website launched in 2004. It is the largest social networking website in Latvia with approximately 2.6 million registered users.

The Draugiem social network operates under the Draugiem Group, an umbrella organisation that owns other IT-related companies which have developed as suppliers of technology to the social network.

The English-language version of Draugiem is known as Frype.com.

History
The Draugiem.lv social network was founded in 2004 by Lauris Liberts and Agris Tamanis. In 2007, the company reported it had reached 1,000,000 users. By 2017 the company had opened offices and facilities in Cēsis, Barcelona, Los Angeles, Charlotte and Tijuana, as well as relocating their Rīga headquarters to a bigger building in the neighborhood of Torņakalns. In 2019, Mapon (part of Draugiem Group) opened offices in Estonia and Finland.

On the 2018 Latvian parliamentary election on October 6 the main page of Draugiem.lv was hacked and replaced with an image of a Russian flag, Russian president Vladimir Putin and Russian army, as well as text in Russian saying "Latvian comrades, this is for you. Russia's borders are boundless. Russian world can and needs to unite everyone who values Russian culture no matter where they live – in Russia or outside its borders. We recommend using the phrase ‘Russian world’ more often", while the Russian national anthem played in the background. The website was taken offline and re-opened a few hours later.

Brands

Road Games 
In 2019 the company created Roadgames, an adventure travel game, with an investment of EUR 100,000. The game requires participants to take part in tasks outside, and is intended as a team building activity for organizations.

Mapon 
The Mapon brand was launched in 2006 to provide GPS tracking services for businesses, and is the second largest brand in the Draugiem company with 54 employees and offices in Finland.

Fast Brands 
Fast Brands was launched in 2018 and provides companies with the opportunity to sell products online.

References

External links
 
 The Baltic Course article about Draugiem.lv

Internet properties established in 2004
Latvian social networking websites
2004 establishments in Latvia